Joaquín Alberto del Olmo Blanco (born 20 April 1969) is a Mexican former professional football midfielder and current consultant for Real Oviedo of Segunda División.

A defensive midfielder who occasionally played as a fullback at international level, he began his top-division career with Tampico in the 1988–89 season. Del Olmo joined Veracruz in 1990 and soon became a starter; in the 1993–94 season, he played 33 matches and scored 4 times. He joined América after the 1994 World Cup, staying for two years before moving to the Netherlands to Vitesse in the 1996–97 season. Upon del Olmo's return to Mexico in 1997, he represented Necaxa, Tigres UANL, Puebla, and Chiapas during the following six years. Most of that time was spent at Tigres, where he participated in the Invierno 2001 final. He closed his top-flight career with UNAM, playing on the Pumas team that won consecutive championships in 2004.

Del Olmo also earned 51 caps and 3 goals for the Mexico national team. He made his international debut on 29 June 1993 against Costa Rica, in a 2–0 victory. Under coach Miguel Mejia Baron, del Olmo represented Mexico in that year's CONCACAF Gold Cup and made the squad for the 1994 FIFA World Cup, where he played in Mexico's first-round games against Norway, Ireland, and Italy. He also appeared at the 1995 Copa América and 1996 CONCACAF Gold Cup, as well as several qualifiers for the 1998 FIFA World Cup, but he missed out on Manuel Lapuente's final World Cup squad. After a long absence from the team, del Olmo was recalled at age 32 by Enrique Meza in 2001. He earned his last cap on 16 June 2001 in a 2–1 loss at Estadio Azteca to Costa Rica in a qualifier for the 2002 FIFA World Cup.

Career statistics

International goals 

|-
| 1. || 13 October 1993 || RFK Stadium, Washington, D.C., United States ||  || align=center|1–0 || align=center|1–1 || Friendly
|-
| 2. || 29 May 1996 || Hakatanomori Football Stadium, Fukuoka, Japan ||  || align=center|1–0 || align=center|2–3 || 1996 Kirin Cup
|-
| 3. || 13 April 1997 || Estadio Azteca, Mexico City, Mexico ||  || align=center|5–0 || align=center|6–0 || 1998 FIFA World Cup qualification
|}

Honours

Player
UNAM
Mexican Primera División: Clausura 2004, Apertura 2004

Manager
Tijuana
Liga de Ascenso: Apertura 2010

References

External links 
 

1969 births
Living people
Mexican football managers
C.D. Veracruz footballers
Club América footballers
1993 CONCACAF Gold Cup players
1994 FIFA World Cup players
1995 King Fahd Cup players
1995 Copa América players
1996 CONCACAF Gold Cup players
CONCACAF Gold Cup-winning players
Mexico international footballers
Sportspeople from Tampico, Tamaulipas
Footballers from Tamaulipas
Chiapas F.C. footballers
Mexican expatriate footballers
Mexican footballers
Mexican expatriate sportspeople in the Netherlands
Expatriate footballers in the Netherlands
SBV Vitesse players
Club Necaxa footballers
Tigres UANL footballers
Club Puebla players
Club Universidad Nacional footballers
Liga MX players
Eredivisie players
Correcaminos UAT managers
C.D. Veracruz managers
Club Tijuana managers
Club Universidad Nacional managers
Association football midfielders